Accessibility of telehealth services or F.780.2 is a technical standard developed by the World Health Organization and ITU (Study Group 16) that defines accessibility requirements for technical features to be used and implemented by governments, healthcare providers and manufacturers of telehealth platforms to facilitate the access and use of telehealth services by persons with disabilities.

Definition 
World Health Organization (WHO) defines telehealth as the "delivery of health care services, where patients and providers are separated by distance.

Overview 
 Requirements 1 to 6 for persons with vision impairment and blindness
 Requirements 7 to 11 for deaf and hard of hearing persons
 Requirement 12 for persons with speech difficulties
 Requirements 13 to 15 for persons with mobility impairments
 Requirements 16 to 20 for persons with mental health conditions and psychosocial disabilities
 Requirements 21 to 23 for persons with developmental and intellectual disabilities
 Requirements 24 and 25 for persons with learning disabilities

See also 
 Web accessibility
 Persons with disabilities
 World Health Organization
 International Telecommunication Union

External Links 
 Page on WHO website
 Page on ITU website

References 

ITU-T recommendations
International Telecommunication Union